The Nave Apartments, located on the 600 block of 8th St. in Lewiston, Idaho, were built in 1913.  The building was listed on the National Register of Historic Places in 1978.

It was designed by architect James H. Nave with Swiss Chalet/Swiss Chalet Revival styling, with Nave possibly influenced by Spokane, Washington architect K.K. Cutter.  It has also been known as Wilson Apartments.

It is a three-story  stone and brick building, built with dark brown sandstone from the architect's quarry, named Swallow's Nest.

References

Swiss Chalet Revival architecture
National Register of Historic Places in Nez Perce County, Idaho
Residential buildings completed in 1913